Graham Edward Alfred Kentfield (born 3 September 1940) was Chief Cashier of the Bank of England from 1991 to 1998. The signature of the Chief Cashier appears on British banknotes. Kentfield was replaced as Chief Cashier by Merlyn Lowther.

References

External links
https://web.archive.org/web/20120626233222/http://homepage.ntlworld.com/trev.rh/Notes/historic.htm
http://topfoto.co.uk/imageflows/preview/t=topfoto&f=0340044
http://www.the-saleroom.com/en-gb/auction-catalogues/sheffield-auction-gallery/catalogue-id-srsh10074/lot-c6cc4587-8b03-44b2-94a0-a4de00d78c19

Living people
Chief Cashiers of the Bank of England
Place of birth missing (living people)
1940 births